Ernesto Pérez (born September 5, 1970) is a Spanish judoka.

Achievements

References

1970 births
Living people
Spanish male judoka
Judoka at the 1992 Summer Olympics
Judoka at the 1996 Summer Olympics
Judoka at the 2000 Summer Olympics
Olympic judoka of Spain
Olympic silver medalists for Spain
Olympic medalists in judo
Medalists at the 1996 Summer Olympics
Mediterranean Games silver medalists for Spain
Mediterranean Games bronze medalists for Spain
Mediterranean Games medalists in judo
Competitors at the 1993 Mediterranean Games
Competitors at the 1997 Mediterranean Games
20th-century Spanish people
21st-century Spanish people